Persoonia chamaepitys, commonly known as the prostrate- or mountain geebung, is a shrub endemic to New South Wales in eastern Australia.

Description
The new growth is hairy. The tiny spine-like leaves measure 0.7–1.9 cm long and 0.5–1 mm wide. Flowering occurs over spring and summer (October to January), the small yellow flowers arising from or near the ends of branchlets.

Taxonomy
It was first described by Allan Cunningham in 1825. The origin of the type specimen is unknown. The species name is derived from the Ancient Greek words chamae "ground hugging", and pitys "pine", from resemblance of the foliage to that of pines.

In 1870, George Bentham published the first infrageneric arrangement of Persoonia in Volume 5 of his landmark Flora Australiensis. He divided the genus into three sections, placing P. chamaepitys in P. sect. Amblyanthera. Within the genus Persoonia, P. chamaepitys is classified in the lanceolata group, a group of 54 closely related species with similar flowers but very different foliage. These species will often interbreed with each other where two members of the group occur. Common names include creeping geebung, prostrate geebung, and mountain geebung.

Distribution and habitat 
Persoonia chamaepitys is restricted to central New South Wales from the Upper Goulburn Valley south through the Blue Mountains and Woronora Plateau and into the Budawang Range. It is common around Katoomba to Mount Victoria. Those seen in the Blue Mountains seem to originate on a slope or mound.

Ecology
Long-tongue bees of the genera Chalicodoma and Hylaeus and Eumenid wasps forage among the flowers, although only the long-tongue bee species Leioproctus raymenti is a pollinator. The fruit are eaten and scattered by vertebrates, such as kangaroos, possums, and currawongs and other large birds.

Persoonia chamaepitys is killed by bushfire and regenerates from seed that has remained dormant in the soil.

Cultivation
The species is sometimes seen in cultivation, but has proven difficult to propagate from either seed or cuttings. It makes an attractive rockery plant, its bright green foliage and yellow flowers are features.

References

chamaepitys
Flora of New South Wales
Proteales of Australia
Plants described in 1830
Taxa named by Allan Cunningham (botanist)